Llancacura is a hamlet located at northern shores of Bueno River west of city of La Unión in Ranco Province, southern Chile. It lies upstream of La Barra and downstream of Trumao. Forestry has long been the driving economic activity in the hamlet.

References

Geography of Los Ríos Region
Populated places in Ranco Province